Wilson Darwin Gillette (July 1, 1880 – August 7, 1951) was a Republican member of the U.S. House of Representatives from Pennsylvania serving in the United States House of Representatives from 1941 until his death in Towanda, Pennsylvania in 1951.

Biography
He was born on a farm near Sheshequin, Pennsylvania.  He attended Susquehanna Collegiate Institute in Towanda, Pennsylvania.  He was engaged in agricultural pursuits, clerked in a general store and became a dealer of automobiles in 1913.  He was a member of the Pennsylvania State House of Representatives from 1930 to 1941.

Gillette was elected as a Republican to the 77th Congress to fill the vacancy caused by the death of Albert G. Rutherford, and was reelected to the Seventy-eighth and to the four succeeding Congresses and served from November 4, 1941, until his death from bronchial pneumonia in Towanda, Pennsylvania.

See also
 List of United States Congress members who died in office (1950–99)

References

Sources

Eilson D. Gillette at The Political Graveyard

Republican Party members of the Pennsylvania House of Representatives
1880 births
1951 deaths
American automobile salespeople
People from Bradford County, Pennsylvania
Republican Party members of the United States House of Representatives from Pennsylvania
20th-century American politicians